The now vanished Del Real Palace or Royal Palace  (in Valencian, Palau del Real; in Spanish, Palacio del Real) was the former residence of the kings of Valencia in the «Cap i Casal» (head and home) of the Kingdom, as the city of Valencia was then called. It was on the left bank of the Turia River, where nowadays Jardines del Real are. It was also known as «300 keys palace» in reference to the number of rooms it had in its heights.

From 11th to 19th centuries it was royal seat whether for the kings of the Taifa of Valencia or the monarchs of the Crown of Aragon, the Habsburgs and the Bourbons, while it was less appreciated by the latter.

Late-19th century Valencian political Teodoro Llorente quotes "What happened to you, Palacio del Real? noble mansion of the Valencian monarchs, centre and symbol of our ancient and glorious kingdom (...) All disappeared with the institutions that you represented, the illustrious autonomy of that kingdom that you were head..."

Origins 
It was originally constructed in the 11th century by the king Abd al-Aziz as an almúnia or recreation residence on the outskirts of the city. In Xarq al-Andalus these rural residences of the urban oligarchy, located around the cities, were known as real (from Arabic riyad, garden), which must not be confused with the rafals, which were estates for agrarian production. Thereupon, the Real Palace name arises from the fact that it was one of these almúnies, not because it was a royal residence (of course, nor because it was authentic). The Arabist Henri Péres, in his book Esplendor de Al-Andalus, talks about the beauty and grandeur of the palace, which "included a big garden planted with fruit trees and flowers and a river that crossed it, and the palace is located in the middle, with richly decorated pavilions, which gaped open to the garden".

In 1364, in the course of the war with Castile, the troops of Peter the Cruel burned it down and looted it.

Expansion 

Afterwards, Peter the Ceremonious practically rebuilt it as the residence of the Aragonese monarchs almost entirely, incorporating some very partial remains of the old architecture, and broadened the gardens in the 14th century, keeping in mind to build a true bigger palace. John I also enlarged it so as Alfonso the Magnanimous, who, during the few years he resided in Valencia before conquering Naples, consolidated it as a royal residence and made considerable expenses to turn it into one of the best regal palaces in the Crown of Aragon. His wife, queen Maria, for whom it was one of her most favoured residences, lived there permanently with her court. From there she governed the peninsular kingdoms of the Crown of Aragon while her husband was away. Inventories of that time indicate that it was a sumptuously decorated palace, with abundant tapestries, paintings and rich furniture. Ferdinand the Catholic, Germaine of Foix and the Duke of Calabria also improved the facilities.

The palace was composed of two attached bodies, called Real Vell (Old Real) and Real Nou (New Real). The old Arab building had a central courtyard and four towers. There were two patios in the new part. The main halls, where audiences, parties and receptions were held, were on the first floor. There were gardens with ponds and exotic plants brought on purpose from America, and a menagerie with lions, bears, deer, pheasants, peacocks and other animals. Some of those gardens are the current Viveros.

In the early modern period (16th and 17th centuries) it was the residence of the viceroys of Valencia, and also headquarters of the Cancelleria Reial (Royal Chancery) of the kingdom of Valencia archive, created by Alfonso the Magnanimous, and originating part of the current Archive of the Kingdom of Valencia. Subsequently, in the 18th century, after the Nueva Planta decree, it also served as the residence of the captain generals.

Thereupon it underwent major work; the inner and external structure was modified, the Gothic windows that made it had a medieval look were removed, and an arched gallery was added on the main façade. Captain general of Valencia from 1721 to 1737, the nobleman of Italian origin Luigi Reggio, 4th prince of Campofiorito, took the initiative to organise in the Real Gardens the first opera performances ever played in Valencia.

Thus, the Palace had a long history with numerous extensions and reforms that made him the recipient of a cluster of architectural experiences, reflecting constructive ways and forms of different eras lived.

From demolition to present 

In 1810, during the Peninsular War, in order to deny the palace to the Napoleonic troops and avoid they using it as a bastion against the city, Valencians themselves decided to demolish it, which was absolutely useless. In fact, the demolition was due to a combination of factors: a poor military strategy, the economic needs of the Junta de Defensa and the perception by the bourgeois, liberal classes that this old grand palace was the main symbol of the past. Only some fragment of the coffered ceiling, preserved at the Arxiu del Regne, was saved from its formidable brickwork.

In 1986 in the wake of a works carried out in the collectors of the city, was lifted the asphalt of street General Elio, and under it were the remains of the palace. After much controversy over whether the remains were to be buried or laid bare, it was decided to bury them because the street is one of the main arteries of the city.

Earlier year 2009, new tastings with GPR were made, discarding a massive excavation and appear new remains that arouse interest for the palace that was the emblem of the city.

Although it is clear that the Del Real Palace is irrecoverable, in 1810 was razed to the ground, the illusion of archaeologists is increasing. Excavations at the Viveros garden were made. Archaeologists have unearthed last week the first walls, belonging to the Torre de la Reina. A magnificent tower which was the residence of the Queen Maria, wife of Alfonso V of Aragon, although in the last period of the palace was used as a kitchen. Experts say they are about to stumble upon the foundations of the called Torre del Rey and the large porch of the set of buildings.

During all these years since the demolition, the only visible building was a small existing mound in the Jardines del Real, known as montañeta del General Elio. It is said consists of the rubble that had accumulated at the time of the destruction of the palace and is now an integral part of the Jardines del Real.

Nowadays we know accurately how this architectural ensemble was, thanks to the discovery of the palace plans which, drawn in 1802 by military engineer Manuel Cavallero, were deposited in the family archive of Marshall Suchet, governor of Valencia in Napoleonic era. The plans were part of the spoils that the French troops looted and taken to Paris, where they remained ignored until they were fortuitously discovered by professor Josep Vicent Boira in 2004.

References 

Demolished buildings and structures in Valencia
Palaces in the Valencian Community
Buildings and structures completed in the 11th century
Royal residences in Spain
Former palaces in Spain
Gothic palaces
Buildings and structures in Spain demolished during the Peninsular War
Buildings and structures demolished in 1810